Ezana was a 5th-century King of the Kingdom of Axum. He is primarily known from the coins that were minted during his reign.

References

Kings of Axum
5th-century monarchs in Africa